Following the revocation of the special status of Jammu and Kashmir, the former state of Jammu and Kashmir was bifurcated into the union territory of Jammu and Kashmir and the union territory of Ladakh. Following the bifurcation, calls in Jammu and Kashmir began for the restoration of its statehood, while Ladakh also saw similar demands in the following months.

References 

Ladakh
Jammu and Kashmir